Funatsu Station may refer to:
 Funatsu Station (Toba, Mie), a railway station in Toba, Mie Prefecture, Japan
 Funatsu Station (Kihoku, Mie), a railway station in Kihoku, Mie Prefecture, Japan